Flax clavus is a moth of the family Erebidae first described by Michael Fibiger in 2011. It is found in Indonesia (western Java).

The wingspan is 11.5–12 mm. The forewings are light brown, although the subterminal, terminal areas and fringes are brown. There is a black-brown quadrangular patch in the upper medial area. The base of the costa is black brown at the base, subapically with small brown dots. The crosslines are indistinct light brown. The terminal line is indicated by dark-brown interveinal dots. The hindwings are grey with a discal spot. The underside of the forewings is unicolorous brown and the underside of the hindwings is grey with a discal spot.

References

Micronoctuini
Moths described in 2011
Taxa named by Michael Fibiger